Freely redistributable software (FRS) is software that anyone is free to redistribute. The term has been used to mean two types of free to redistribute software, distinguished by the legal modifiability and limitations on purpose of use of the software. FRS which can be legally modified and used for any purpose is the same as free software.  Non-legally modifiable FRS is freeware, shareware or similar.

The non-modifiable FRS generally comes in the form of executable binaries and is often used by proprietary software companies and authors to showcase their work or to encourage the user to buy full products from them (in the case of shareware, demo or trial versions). Freeware that is not restricted to be obtained from a specific distributor is also FRS.

Firmware and microcode
In cases of firmware or microcode, it is acceptable for major open-source projects like OpenBSD to include a binary firmware of a device within the distribution, as long as said firmware runs only on the external device in question, and not on the main CPU where the operating system itself is running.
However, for such an inclusion to be in place, the binary firmware must be distributed under an adequate licence, like ISC or BSD, and must not require a discriminatory contract to be in place.
A lack of such licence is why wireless devices from Intel Corporation do not work out of the box in almost all open-source distributions, whereas Ralink wireless cards work just fine.

References

Software licenses